The Eurofly Fire Fox (sometimes Firefox) is an Italian ultralight aircraft designed and produced by Eurofly srl of Galliera Veneta. The aircraft is supplied as a complete ready-to-fly-aircraft or as a kit for amateur construction.

Design and development
The Fire Fox features a strut-braced high-wing, a two-seats-in-tandem enclosed cockpit, fixed tricycle landing gear with wheel pants and a single engine in pusher configuration.

The aircraft is made from a combination of ALS 500 steel tubing and 6082 aluminium alloy tubing, with its flying surfaces covered in Dacron sailcloth. Each wing is supported by two parallel struts with jury struts. The standard engine used is the  Rotax 503 two-stroke powerplant.

Variants
Fire Fox
Base model
Fire Fox 2000
Fully equipped variant including electric flaps.

Specifications (Fire Fox)

References

External links

Eurofly Fire Fox photo

Fire Fox
1990s Italian sport aircraft
1990s Italian ultralight aircraft
Single-engined tractor aircraft
High-wing aircraft
Homebuilt aircraft